Carterocephalus dieckmanni  is a species of butterfly found in the East Palearctic (Northeast China, Amur, Ussuri, North Burma) that belongs to the skippers family.

Description from Seitz

P. dieckmanni Graes. (— gemmatus Leech, demea Oberth.) (87 d) Forewing beneath with the spots in cellules 1 a and 2 united with those in cellule 3, forming an uninterrupted median band. Amur, West-China, Tibet.

Subspecies
Carterocephalus dieckmanni dieckmanni - southern Amur and Ussuri
Carterocephalus dieckmanni minor Evans, 1932 - China

See also
List of butterflies of Russia

References

Heteropterinae
Butterflies described in 1888